Grogan’s Point is an estate neighborhood and golf course community in the Village of Grogan’s Mill of The Woodlands, a planned community in Texas.

Established in 1982, it is third of nine estate neighborhoods developed in The Woodlands. Its namesake is the Grogan-Cochran Lumber Company, the last sawmill to operate in the area. It is characterized by large residences on large land lots. It consists of 800 acres, 465 estates, 3 parks, and 2 ponds. It borders the 13th hole of The Oaks Golf Course of The Woodlands Resort, which is ranked by Golf Digest as one of the best golf resorts in North America.

Grogan's Point is known for the six historic-inspired estates built by the Westbrook Building Company. It was a prominent neighborhood for many Enron executives and remains closely linked to the energy industry due to the proximity of ExxonMobil's main campus.

History 
Grogan's Point was initially envisioned as an equestrian community, emphasizing George Mitchell's founding vision of The Woodlands staying close to nature. As development of the Grogan's Mill Village began in 1972, it was stalled by the 1970s energy crisis, which significantly affected Greater Houston due to its standing as the "Energy capital of the world." To attract buyers from River Oaks and Memorial, the plan was changed to build an estate neighborhood characterized by large residences on large land lots. Development was led by Wally and Leo Westbrook of the Westbrook Building Company, who constructed the first 80 estates. Grogan's Point success became the model for estate neighborhoods future villages would follow, including West Isle (1988), Windward Cove (1990), The Cove (1991), Carlton Woods (1998), Carlton Woods Creekside (2007), and East Shore (2008).

Development of Grogan's Point commenced in three main phases:

 Phase 1 (1982-1990), Grogans Point Rd, Watertree, Longspur, Southgate
 Phase 2 (1993-1999), Red Sable, Northgate, N. Tranquil Path, Hillock Woods
 Phase 3 (2004-2011), S. Tranquil Path, Starlight, Angel Leaf

Flooding 
Grogan's Point is encircled by Spring Creek and Panther Creek and has been increasingly challenged by flooding potentially due to climate change. Following the flooding of Hurricane Harvey, Texas Governor Greg Abbott directed the San Jacinto River Authority in April 2018 to "find ways to mitigate flooding" in neighborhoods such as Grogan's Point. In October 2018, The Woodlands Water Agency proposed a project "to enlarge four box culverts," for Grogan's Point. As of July 2019, mitigation efforts are still underway.

Major floods

 October 1994, Flood of Record
 June 2001, Tropical Storm Allison
 August 2017, Hurricane Harvey

Minor floods

 August 2005, Hurricane Katrina
 August 2007, Tropical Storm Erin
 September 2008, Hurricane Ike
 May 2015, Texas–Oklahoma Flood and Tornado Outbreak
 April 2016, North American Storm Complex
 May 2016, North American Storm Complex

Governance 
Grogan's Point falls under the governance of the Grogan's Mill Village Association, and in-turn, The Woodlands Township, a special-purpose district created by the 73rd Texas Legislature in 1993. The Woodlands is not a city nor a traditional township government, however it still provides limited municipal government services such as trash pickup, parks and recreation, covenant enforcement, fire and rescue services, streetscaping, economic development, and enhanced law enforcement and security patrols.

Grogan's Point Residents' Association is a voluntary social membership organization for residents. Affiliate membership is available for former residents. It is governed by bylaws. The stated mission of GPRA is to "promote a beautiful, safe, vibrant, friendly, and informed community for all residents of Grogan’s Point."

Amenities 

The Woodlands Resort
500 acres
4 restaurants
The Oaks and Panther Trail Golf Courses
Forest Oasis Waterpark and Lazy river
21 outdoor and indoor tennis courts
Two swimming pools, three whirlpools
Spa and Fitness Center
402 hotel rooms
Conference Center with 33 meeting rooms
Direct access to 200+ miles of nature trails throughout Woodlands

Grogan's Point Park
 7 acres
Basketball, Tennis, and Volleyball courts, Soccer field and Swing Set
 Pavilion, Picnic tables, BBQ pits, Drinking fountains, Restrooms, Parking
 Mel Killian Park
 Fishing
 Pastoral Pond Park
 Fishing
Hike and Jog
2 mile paved track spanning Grogan's Point Rd
Direct access to 200+ miles of nature trails throughout Woodlands

Notable estates 

The Antebellum, inspired by the Houmas House Plantation and Gardens
62 Grogans Point Rd
Built in 1988 by the Westbrook Building Company
8,372 sqft
1.54 acres
Carpenter Estate, inspired by the Château de Lucé
206 N Tranquil Path
Built in 1996 by the Westbrook Building Company
8,400 sqft
2 acres
Governor's Estate, inspired by the Texas Governor's Mansion
3 Misty Grove
Built in 1990 by the Westbrook Building Company
9,851 sqft
0.89 acres
Rovirosa Estate, 2nd largest estate in Grogan's Point
47 N Longspur
Built in 1985
17,707 sqft
2.83 acres
Oak Alley, inspired by the Oak Alley Plantation
86 Red Sable
Built in 1994 by the Westbrook Building Company
9,707 sqft
1.48 acres
Pew Estate, 3rd largest estate in Grogan's Point
66 Red Sable
Built in 1992 by the Westbrook Building Company
16,621 sqft
1.69 acres
Powell Estate, largest land lot in Grogan's Point
126 S Tranquil Path
Built in 2004
10,582 sqft
8.95 acres
Turek Compound, largest estate in Grogan's Point
199 N Tranquil Path
Built in 1999, inspired by the White House northern facing facade
8,805 sqft
2.03 acres
203 N Tranquil Path Dr
Built in 2014, inspired by the West Wing
19,513 sqft
2.29 acres
Thistle Hill, inspired by the Wharton–Scott House
38 Grogans Point Rd
Built in 1989 by the Westbrook Building Company
6,549 sqft
0.71 acres

Notable residents 

 Adrian Peterson
 Josh Lowrey Entrepreneur and Host of Oilfield 360 Podcast
 Lyle Lovett
 Robert Marling
 Patrick Reed 2018 Masters Champion
Alexandro Rovirosa Martinez, founder and chief executive at Roma Energy

See also 

 George P. Mitchell
 The Woodlands
The Woodlands Resort
Cynthia Woods Mitchell Pavilion

References 

The Woodlands, Texas